Zsombor Jéger (born 16 March 1991) is a Hungarian actor. He had his debut age four in A dzsungel könyve, a Hungarian musical based on The Jungle Book, at the Csokonai Theatre in Debrecen, where he later acted in several children and youth roles.

Early life and family background
Zsombor Jéger was born in Debrecen Hungary. He is the son of Jéger Attila who is a piano tuner and has been playing in several bands in the mid 1990s playing alternative Blues. His mother Bandi Margit is a Hungarian teacher, and mental hygiene specialist. Jéger grew up with his two sisters who are also bonded with the Hungarian artistic sphere.

At an early age he started playing the violin and has been playing ever since. He plays many instruments in an autodidact way.

Films 
 Jupiter's Moon

References

External links 

 

Living people
1991 births
Hungarian male actors